Loŭčycy is a village in Navahrudak District of Grodno Region, Belarus. As of 2009, approximately 16 people live in the village.

Islamic history 
Loŭčycy was historically a site of pilgrimage for Lipka Tatar Muslims, dating back to at least 1558. Compared to Mecca and Medina, the two holiest cities in Islam, pilgrimages declined due to the anti-religious policy of the Soviet Union. The original mosque, built in 1688, was rebuilt in 2002.

Loŭčycy was particularly an important site for Sufism in Belarus. The tomb of wali Eŭlii Kontus, a shepherd who possessed the power to heal the sick and crippled, as well as travel to Mecca in an instant, was an important site for Sufis in the Polish–Lithuanian Commonwealth and Russian Empire.

References 

Islam in Belarus
Navahrudak District
Novogrudsky Uyezd
Nowogródek Voivodeship (1507–1795)
Nowogródek Voivodeship (1919–1939)
Populated places in Grodno Region
Sufism in Europe
Villages in Belarus